Willem Jackson (born 26 March 1972 in Bloemfontein, Free State) is a retired South African footballer who played as defender. A fullback capable of lining up on either flank, he played mostly for Bloemfontein Celtic and Orlando Pirates.

Jackson also played for South Africa, earning 18 caps, and was a part of the squad that travelled to France for the 1998 FIFA World Cup. During the tournament, he appeared in the first-round matches against France and Saudi Arabia, starting both matches at right back. Jackson made his international debut against France on 11 October 1997. His final international appearance came on 29 April 2001, a 3–0 victory over Mozambique in the COSAFA Castle Cup.

References

External links

South African soccer players
South Africa international soccer players
1997 FIFA Confederations Cup players
1998 FIFA World Cup players
1998 African Cup of Nations players
Bloemfontein Celtic F.C. players
Orlando Pirates F.C. players
Platinum Stars F.C. players
1972 births
Living people
Cape Coloureds
Sportspeople from Bloemfontein
Association football defenders
Soccer players from the Free State (province)